Milgithea trilinearis is a species of snout moth in the genus Milgithea. It is found in Florida.

References

Moths described in 1906
Epipaschiinae